Eldred Kurtz Means (March 11, 1878 – February 19, 1957) was an American Methodist Episcopal clergyman, famed public speaker, and author. A white man, he wrote fictional stories about African/African American characters who lived in an area of Louisiana which he named Tickfall. He described the characters in the most grotesque, comical and sensational terms. His magazine stories were compiled into books.  He was a constant and prolific contributor to Frank A. Munsey's pulp magazines such as All-Story Weekly, Argosy and its predecessors.  His use of black stereotypes, minstrel show motifs, Jim Crow characters, fantastical mimicry and impressionism of Negro dialect made him a popular author with a niche of white audiences; but the implicit racist message has not aged well.

Early life
Means was born in Taylor County, Kentucky, the son of Virginia née Lively Means and George Hamilton Means. He married Ella Q. Crebbin in Monroe, Louisiana.

Ministry
Means was educated at Dodd’s University School in Cincinnati, Ohio. He received a Doctor of Divinity, Centenary College of Louisiana.

He had a far flung clerical career, involving more than a dozen posts:
 1899 Ordained ministry Methodist Episcopal Church, South,
 1899–1900, Pastor Ghent, Kentucky
 1901, Erlanger
 1902, Hodgenville
 1903–1905, Louisiana Avenue Church, New Orleans
 1905–1909, Baton Rouge
 1909–1913, Minden
 1913–1915,  Shreveport
 1915–1917, Arcadia
 1917–1921, Monroe
 1922–1925, Galloway Memorial Church, Jackson, Mississippi
 1925–1929, Court St. Church, Lynchburg, Virginia
 1929–1933 Main Street Methodist Episcopal Church South, Danville, Virginia
 1933–1937, Travis Street Church, Sherman, Texas
 1937–1939, First Church, Helena, Arkansas
 1939–1944,  Central Methodist Church, Rogers, Arkansas

He was a Democrat.

Literary work
Over more than a half century, he wrote scores of short stories for pulp fiction magazines.  A fairly complete listing of his published stories appears in the following reference.  In 1924, Irvin S. Cobb, an American humorist, numbered Means’s “darky stories” among his favorites.  In the Fort Worth Star-Telegram, he wrote: "[Means] is at home in Jackson, Miss. ... and pastor of Galloway Memorial Church M.E., South. ... He is a zealous clergyman, a gifted speaker, and a fluent writer, but being, as befits a clergyman, a truthful man also, Mr. Means would lay no claim to great personal beauty."  

Means defended his use of dialect, persons and places as being true-to-type with verisimilitude to a passing and important lifestyle and culture.  He claimed a love for the people  the musicality and rhythm of their language, and professed a linguist's and an anthropologist's intent to preserve transitory culture and cultural artifacts  which were in imminent danger of extirpation, as the shadow of slavery waned in the distance.

The publisher G.P. Putnam's Sons promoted him as part of its stable of authors highlighting white supremacy over other races.

In 1918, an Ebony Film Corporation advertisement teased a coming film based on one of his Tickfall Tales titled Good Luck in Old Clothes.  The film was produced and promoted as exemplifying "wholesome real droll Negro humor."

In addition to his short stories, he had several books published. Edward Winsor Kemble  well known for his racist (purportedly accurate and humorous) caricatures  illustrated several of his books. His books were reviewed in several newspapers.

Reception
Reviews of his works at the time were mixed, with the New York Tribune giving a favorable report.  In contrast, the Brooklyn Daily Eagle wrote:  “There are, among the better writers of today, three who can write negro stories with humor and understanding, and E.K. Means is not one of them”.  Several of his books, having gone out of copyright, have been reproduced by various republishers.

Means touted 'lack of titles' on three of his books was not universally welcomed.  A New York Times reviewer castigated the third in the series: "The crass lack of good taste, and worse than crass conceit shown by the title of this volume, are not-redeemed by any remarkable quality in its content."

His story "At the End of the Rope" contains the earliest known usage of the saying: If it wasn't for bad luck I wouldn't have any luck at all.

He was one of the earliest recognized users of the word "doodlebug".

Works (in chronological order)
 
 Means, E.K.; Kemble, Edward Winsor, Illustrator. (1918) E. K. Means: Is This a Title? It Is Not. It Is the Name of a Writer of Negro Stories, Who Has Made Himself So Completely the Writer of Negro Stories That His Book Needs No Title New York, London: The Knickerbocker Press, G. P. Putnam's Sons
 Means, E.K.; Kemble, Edward Winsor, Illustrator. (1919) More E. K. Means: Is This a Title? It Is Not. It Is the Name of a Writer of Negro Stories, Who Has Made Himself So Completely the Writer of Negro Stories That His Second Book Needs No Title New York, London: The Knickerbocker Press, G. P. Putnam's Sons
 Means, E.K.; Kemble, Edward Winsor, Illustrator. (1920) Is This a Title? It Is Not. It Is the Name of a Writer of Negro Stories, Who Has Made Himself So Completely the Writer of Negro Stories That This Third Book, Like the First and Second, Needs No Title New York, London: The Knickerbocker Press, G. P. Putnam's Sons
 
 “At the End of the Rope” by E. K. Means, Munsey's Magazine, New York (1927)

See also
 All-Negro Comics
 Cultural appropriation
 Helen Bannerman
 Tickfaw, Louisiana

References

Citations

Bibliography

Further reading

External links
  at LibriVox (public domain audiobooks)
 Eldred Kurtz Means at IMDb.
 Means, E.K. at Project Gutenberg.

1878 births
1957 deaths
19th-century American clergy
20th-century American clergy
20th-century American short story writers
American humorists
American male short story writers
American Methodist clergy
American Protestant ministers and clergy
Centenary College of Louisiana alumni
Members of the Methodist Episcopal Church
Pulp fiction writers